Fernand Tavano (21 May 1933 – 6 July 1984) was a French racing driver.

References

1933 births
1984 deaths
French racing drivers
24 Hours of Le Mans drivers